A leadership election for Christian and Democratic Union – Czechoslovak People's Party (KDU-ČSL) was held on 28 May 2015. Incumbent Pavel Bělobrádek was re-elected when he received votes of 251 delegates (of 275).

Belobrádek didn't have any candidate. Party's Vice-chairman Marian Jurečka was speculated to run against Bělobrádek but he decided to not take part in the election. He said that he doesn't want to split the party.

References

KDU-ČSL leadership elections
2015 elections in the Czech Republic
2015 Christian and Democratic Union - Czechoslovak People's Party
Indirect elections
Christian and Democratic Union - Czechoslovak People's Party leadership election
May 2015 events in Europe